Ali Lashgari was an Iranian football player who played for Persepolis in Iran Pro League.

Club career

Club career statistics

References

Living people
Iranian footballers
Persepolis F.C. players
Association football forwards
Year of birth missing (living people)